John Frederick Bollands (born 11 July 1935) was an English professional footballer who played as a goalkeeper for Sunderland.

References

1935 births
Living people
People from Middlesbrough
English footballers
Association football goalkeepers
Oldham Athletic A.F.C. players
Sunderland A.F.C. players
Bolton Wanderers F.C. players
English Football League players